Shumate is a surname. Notable people with the surname include:

 Anderson E. Shumate (1879–1947), American politician
 David Shumate, American poet
 Fern Shumate (1910–2003), American writer
 Harold Shumate (1893–1983), American screenwriter
 Ignatius Elgin Shumate (1834–1907), American politician
 Jabar Shumate (born 1976), American politician
 Jessamine Shumate (1902–1990), American artist, historian and cartographer
 Jim Shumate (1921–2013), American bluegrass fiddler
 John Shumate (born 1952), American basketball player
 Keith Shumate, American college baseball player and coach
 Mark Shumate (born 1960), American football player
 Whitney Shumate (1896–1966), American businessman and civic leader